Richmond is a small townland in the historical barony  of Ormond Lower, County Tipperary, Ireland. The townland borders and overlaps with the town of Nenagh. As of the 2011 census, the townland had a population of 153 people.

The ruins of Richmond House and its entrance pillars and railings are listed on Tipperary County Council's Record of Protected Structures (ref S333).

References

Townlands of County Tipperary